Nahiyah Sawran may refer to:

Sawran Subdistrict, Aleppo Governorate
Suran Subdistrict, Hama Governorate